The KNFB - Austria and Moravia were two first steam locomotives used by the Kaiser Ferdinands-Nordbahn in Austria. The pair of 2-2-0 locomotives were built by Robert Stephenson and Company and delivered in 1837. The cylinders were arranged under the smokebox and drove the cranked second axle. The boiler was covered with wooden strips.

Austria led the opening train of the KFNB from Floridsdorf to Deutsch-Wagram. Both locomotives were soon not powerful enough to cope with the increasing traffic and were transferred to the Stockerau line (Stockerauer Flügelbahn). After a serious accident at Versailles on the Paris – Versailles railway on May 8, 1842, the use of two-axle locomotives was banned in Austria. The Austria and the Moravia therefore had to be withdrawn from service. They were stored in 1846, struck off in 1849 and scrapped in 1849 or 1852 after a conversion to the 2-2-2 wheel arrangement with an additional carrying axle did not materialize.

Steam locomotives of Austria
2-2-0 locomotives
Robert Stephenson and Company locomotives
Railway locomotives introduced in 1837